Razdor is a rural locality (a selo) and the administrative center of Razdorsky Selsoviet, Kamyzyaksky District, Astrakhan Oblast, Russia. The population was 1,208 as of 2010. There are 17 streets.

Geography 
Razdor is located 18 km southeast of Kamyzyak (the district's administrative centre) by road. Zastenka is the nearest rural locality.

References 

Rural localities in Kamyzyaksky District